In the United States, smoker protection laws are state statutes that prevent employers from discriminating against employees for using tobacco products. Currently twenty-nine states and the District of Columbia have such laws. Although laws vary from state to state, employers are generally prohibited from either refusing to hire or firing an employee for using any type of tobacco product during non-working hours and off of the employer's property. In four states (California, Colorado, New York, and North Carolina) there is no specific law related to employee tobacco use but smokers are protected under broader state statutes that prohibit employers from discriminating against any employee who engages in a lawful activity. California also has a law that protects employees who engage in lawful activity, but it has been interpreted by the courts as not creating any new substantive rights but instead set forth a process to pursue claims for violation of existing Labor Code protections before the state Division of Labor Standards Enforcement.

Most of these laws were first enacted in the late 1980s and early 1990s. However, as discrimination against smokers in the workplace has become more widespread in recent years, several states have enacted such laws more recently. In states without smoker protection laws some employers have begun refusing to hire new employees who smoke. While many of these employers are using the honor system to enforce these policies, a few of them are requiring that employees be tested for nicotine. Many of the businesses with these policies are in the healthcare industry, but some county and municipal governments have also enacted such policies.

Arizona previously had a smoker protection law but it was repealed 2007.

States with smoker protection laws

References

External links
 State Smoker Protection Laws - American Lung Association
 Individual State Smoking Laws & Tobacco Control Efforts - American Lung Association
  -American Lung Association
 Employee Off-Duty Conduct- National Conference of State Legislatures
 Smoking Not a Right: Federal Court

Smoking in the United States
Tobacco control
United States law-related lists